Ivan Filin (March 10, 1926 – 2000) was a marathon runner from the Soviet Union, who won the silver medal at the European Championships in Stockholm, Sweden, behind compatriot Sergei Popov. He is a two-time winner of the Soviet national marathon title (1955–1956), and won the 1957 edition of the Košice Peace Marathon. He was born in Kimovsk, Tula Oblast.

Achievements

References
 
 Ivan Filin's profile at the ARRS

1926 births
2000 deaths
People from Kimovsky District
Soviet male long-distance runners
Russian male long-distance runners
Athletes (track and field) at the 1956 Summer Olympics
Olympic athletes of the Soviet Union
European Athletics Championships medalists
Sportspeople from Tula Oblast